George Christopher Williams (born 7 September 1995) is a professional footballer who plays as a winger for Hemel Hempstead Town on loan from National League club Boreham Wood. He has previously been capped for the Wales national team at several age groups including seven caps for the senior team.

Between 12 November 2011 and 1 September 2020, Williams was the record holder for being the youngest ever player to score in the FA Cup at the age of 16 years and 66 days following his goal for Milton Keynes Dons in a 6–0 win over Nantwich Town.

Club career

Milton Keynes Dons
Born in Milton Keynes, Williams joined the academy of Milton Keynes Dons at a young age and progressed through several age groups alongside future England international Dele Alli. On 12 November 2011, at the age of 16 years and 66 days, he made his first team debut and scored in a 6–0 home FA Cup first round win over Nantwich Town. In doing so, Williams became the youngest ever player to score in the history of the competition, as well as becoming the club's youngest ever goalscorer.

Fulham
On 14 June 2012, Williams joined Premier League side Fulham as a first year academy scholar for the 2012–13 season after an undisclosed compensation package was agreed between the two clubs. Following his move to Fulham, MK Dons chairman Pete Winkelman said he was disappointed seeing Williams leave the club, and told the club's official website: "We are very disappointed that George has chosen not to take up his scholarship or the offer of a professional contract with MK Dons and has instead decided his future is best served with Fulham".

Loan spells
On 16 February 2015, Williams rejoined League One side Milton Keynes Dons on a youth loan for the remainder of the 2014–15 season, but his loan was cut short by an anterior cruciate ligament injury, keeping him out for between four and six months.

On 12 February 2016, Williams joined League One side Gillingham on loan until the end of the 2015–16 season.

On 29 July 2016, Williams returned to Milton Keynes Dons on loan until the end of the 2016–17 season.

On 31 January 2018, Williams joined Scottish Premiership side St. Johnstone on loan until the end of the 2017–18 season.

Forest Green Rovers
On 12 June 2018, Williams signed for League Two club Forest Green Rovers. On 4 September 2018, He scored his first goal for the club in a 4-0 EFL Trophy win over Cheltenham Town.

Grimsby Town
On 13 August 2020, Williams signed a two-year contract with League Two team Grimsby Town.

Following on from Grimsby's relegation from the Football League at the end of the 2020–21 season, Williams was deemed surplus to requirements and was transfer listed by manager Paul Hurst with the player being made available on a free transfer.

On 11 August 2021, Williams was released by Grimsby by mutual consent, he played 23 times for The Mariners, scoring twice in all competitions but had struggled to break into Hurst's team after initially being brought to the club by previous manager Ian Holloway.

Barrow
On the same day as his release by Grimsby, it was announced that Williams had joined Barrow in August 2021. He was released at the end of the season.

Boreham Wood
On 14 July 2022, Williams signed for National League club Boreham Wood. In February 2023, he joined Hemel Hempstead Town on loan until the end of the season.

International career
Williams qualifies for Wales through his mother and represented Wales at under-17 and under-19 levels. On 5 March 2014, Williams made his Wales under-21 debut as an 83rd-minute substitute in a 1–0 defeat to England. On 27 May 2014, he was called up to the senior Wales squad for a friendly match against Holland to be played on 4 June 2014 as a replacement for the injured Gareth Bale. He made his international debut as a replacement for Jonathan Williams in the 70th minute of the match.

Williams was included by manager Chris Coleman as a member of Wales' Euro 2016 squad that reached the semi-finals of the tournament, although he did not make an appearance.

Career statistics

Club

International

References

External links

1995 births
Living people
People from Milton Keynes
Footballers from Buckinghamshire
Welsh people of English descent
Welsh footballers
Wales youth international footballers
Wales under-21 international footballers
Wales international footballers
Association football wingers
Milton Keynes Dons F.C. players
Fulham F.C. players
Gillingham F.C. players
St Johnstone F.C. players
Forest Green Rovers F.C. players
Grimsby Town F.C. players
Barrow A.F.C. players
Boreham Wood F.C. players
Hemel Hempstead Town F.C. players
English Football League players
Scottish Professional Football League players
National League (English football) players
UEFA Euro 2016 players